Judy Hall may refer to:
 Judith Goslin Hall (born 1939), American and Canadian pediatrician, clinical geneticist and dysmorphologist
 Judy Hall (pianist) (born 1922), Australian pianist and musician